The German Society for Photography (Deutsche Gesellschaft für Photographie, DGPh) is a German photography organisation, based in Cologne. It is concerned with the application of photography in art, science, education, journalism, economics and politics in cultural contexts.

The DGPh awards prizes for photographic achievements in keeping with its objectives. Its highest award is the Cultural Award (Kulturpreis).

The approximately 1000 appointed members of the DGPh organization come from all areas of photography and are renowned personalities from the German and international photography scene.

Culture Award
The Cultural Award was established in 1958. It recognizes achievements through photography, especially in the artistic, humanitarian, charitable, social, technical, educational or scientific fields. The prize consists of a certificate and a gold-framed optical lens designed by Ewald Mataré and is awarded annually to a living person as the highest honor of the German Society for Photography. Among the winners are scientists, inventors, writers, publishers, editors, lecturers, art directors and above all photographers from Germany and elsewhere.

Recipients

Otto Steinert Prize
The Otto Steinert Prize is a biannual scholarship, established in 1979. It is given for a new photography project that will be completed within one year. The prize is 5000 Euros, which can also be shared. The scholarship is open to professional photographers as well as to photographers who are German or are permanently living in Germany. It is named after the photographer and educator Otto Steinert.

Dr. Erich Salomon Award

The Dr. Erich Salomon Award (Dr.-Erich-Salomon-Preis), established in 1971, is an annual award for photography in journalism. 
The prize consists of a certificate and a Leica M camera with a name engraving. It is named after the German photographer Erich Salomon.

Prize of the Science and Technology Section
The Prize of the Science and Technology Section (Preis der Sektion Wissenschaft und Technik), Established in 1966, it is a prize for research in the field of phototechnology. It was previously called the Robert Luther Prize. "As part of the restructuring of DGPh prices, this will be redefined and named shortly."

Recipients
1966: Klaus Biedermann, Munich for "Determination of the relationship between the subjective quality and the physical properties of the photographic image"
1968: Hans-Jörg Metz, Leverkusen for "The Depth of Exposure of Exposure in a Photographic Layer"
1969: Helmut Tributsch, Munich for "An Electrochemical Method for the Study of Spectral Sensitization and Heterogeneous Photochemical Reactions at ZnO Electrodes"
1971: Erwin Ranz, Leverkusen for "Development of the Equidensity Film 'Agfa-Contour'"
1973: Hans-Theo Buschmann, Leverkusen for "Research in the field of sharpness and granularity of photographic materials"
1974: Hans J. Einighammer, Mülheim an der Ruhr for "Optical integration methods to reduce the noise of photographic and X-ray astronomical applications"
1976: Fritz Habermalz, Tübingen for "Correction of Color Balance in Reverse Color Film Photomicrographs"
1978: Udo Bode, Frankfurt for "Spectral sensitization of the charge passage through the phase boundary zinc oxide electrolyte"
1981: Josef Schneider, Munich for "Structure, Decay, and Spectral Characteristics of Exposure-Induced Absorption Centers in Silver Bromide Model Emulsions"
1989: Wolfgang Schmidt, Leverkusen for "Solid-State Chemical Processes in the Production of Photographic Emulsions"
1993: Gerald Hegenbart, Neu-Isenburg for "Atomic Structure Study of AgBr Crystal Surfaces by Atomic Force Microscopy"; Dirk Hertel, Dresden for "Studies on the image quality of photographic layers by means of optoelectronic image sensors"; Thomas Muessig-Pabst, Neu-Isenburg for "The microwave absorption - a meaningful method for the characterization of silver halide systems"
1995: Jörg Siegel, Leverkusen for "Investigations on the influence of absorbents on the concentration of interstitial silver ions in the AgBr microcrystals of photographic emulsions"
2009: Gerhard Bonnet, Waldfischbach Castle albums for "Development of SpheroCam HDR Full Spherical Camera System"
2014: Philipp Sandhaus, Oldenburg and Christoph Voges, Brunswick

German Camera Award
The German Camera Award is awarded by the Westdeutscher Rundfunk, the City of Cologne and the German Society for Photography. It was established in 1982 as a biannual award for achievements in the field of camera work for film and television. Since 1990, scenic and documentary editing has also been awarded. Since 2001 it has been awarded annually.

The German Camera Award has been awarded in various categories, some of which have been modified from year to year, for the areas of camera and editing. The most significant categories are "feature film", "television film" and "honorary cameraman" (since 1994).

Recipients

History of Photography Research Award
The History of Photography Research Award (Forschungspreis Photographiegeschichte), established in 1978, is an award for scientific research into the history and theory of photography. Until 2010 it was known as the Erich-Stenger Prize.

Recipients

Prize for Science Photography
The Prize for Science Photography (Preis für Wissenschaftsphotographie) is awarded for work that documents a scientific (including medicine) topic or artistically deals with a scientific topic. Prior to 2017 the prize was called the Herbert Schober Prize, after the founder and first chairman of DGPh's section for medical and scientific photography in 1957.

Recipients
2017: Bochum Jannis Wiebusch

Education Award
The Education Award (Bildungspreis) was established in 2013. It is awarded for innovative and sustainable projects as well as scientific papers with practical relevance. These include cultural and museum educational initiatives in which photography is discussed or used, as well as medial educational offerings on photography as well as school and extracurricular activities. The prize is 1000 Euros.

Publications
Otto-Steinert-Preis 1979 - 1998: Ausstellung zur Photokina 1998, 16. 9. – 21. 9. 1998. Cologne: Locher, 1998. By Tina Schelhorn. .
Zeitprofile: Deutsche Gesellschaft für Photographie: German Society for Photography. Göttingen: Steidl, 2014. .

References

External links

German photography organisations
Photography awards
Arts organizations established in the 20th century
Arts organizations established in 1951
1951 establishments in Germany